We Can is the second extended play by South Korean girl group Weeekly. It was released on October 13, 2020 by Play M and distributed by Kakao M. The physical version of the EP was made available in two versions: "Orb" and "Wave". It contains five tracks, including the lead single "Zig Zag".

Background and release 
On September 21, 2020, Play M Entertainment released a teaser photo and announced that Weeekly would make a comeback with their second EP We Can. 

On September 25, they released the first set of concept photos for We Can. On September 29, they released the second set of concept photos for We Can. Six days later, on October 5, the tracklist for We Can was released. It also revealed "Zig Zag" as the lead single. On October 7, the highlight medley for We Can was released. On October 9, the music video teaser for "Zig Zag" was released.

On October 13, We Can and the music video for "Zig Zag" was released.

Promotion 
At the same day as the EP release, on October 13, they had an online media showcase.

They promoted the single "Zig Zag" at Mnet's M Countdown, Arirang TV's Simply K-Pop, KBS2's Music Bank, MBC's Show! Music Core, SBS's Inkigayo and SBS MTV's The Show.

Track listing 
Credits adapted from Melon.

Accolades

Charts

Release history

References 

2020 EPs
Weeekly albums
Korean-language EPs